Amine Rzig (born 25 August 1980) is a Tunisian retired basketball player and current coach.

Rzig is a member of the Tunisia national basketball team that finished third at the 2009 FIBA Africa Championship to qualify for the country's first FIBA World Championship.  Rzig averaged 16.4 PPG and 5.4 RPG for the Tunisians en route to being named to the All-Tournament team.  Highlights for Rzig included scoring a team-leading 20 points in the bronze medal game against Cameroon to lead the Tunisians to the 2010 FIBA World Championship.

References

Stade Nabeulien basketball players
Tunisian men's basketball players
Tunisian basketball coaches
1980 births
Living people
Basketball players at the 2012 Summer Olympics
Olympic basketball players of Tunisia
Étoile Sportive du Sahel basketball players
2010 FIBA World Championship players
Mediterranean Games bronze medalists for Tunisia
Mediterranean Games medalists in basketball
Competitors at the 2013 Mediterranean Games
Tunisian expatriate basketball people in Egypt
21st-century Tunisian people